2012–13 Hong Kong Third Division League is the 62nd season of Hong Kong Third Division League, a football league in Hong Kong.

Team review
The 2012–13 season of the Hong Kong Third Division League consists of 14 clubs, including the 2 teams relegated from 2011–12 Second Division, 3rd placed to 10th placed team of 2011–12 Third 'A' Division and the top 4 teams of 2011–12 Third 'District' Division.

The detail of the clubs is as follows.

League table

Results table

Fixtures and results

Week 1

Week 2

Week 3

Week 4

Week 5

Week 6

Week 7

Week 8

Week 9

Week 10

Week 11

Week 12

Week 13

Week 14

Week 15

Week 16

Week 17

Week 18

Week 19

Week 20

Week 21

Week 22

Week 23

Week 24

Week 25

Week 26

References

3
Hong Kong Third Division League seasons